Iwate Prefectural Board of Education (岩手県教育委員会) is the education authority of Iwate Prefecture, Japan.

It acts as a school district, operating public high schools in the prefecture.

High Schools:
 Morioka First High School
 Morioka Third High School

Prize
Students outstanding in volunteer, sports, and cultural activities are awarded "Habataki Prize (lit. flutter prize)" 
 Habataki Prize (はばたき賞)

External links
 Iwate Prefectural Board of Education (Japanese)

Prefectural school systems in Japan
Board of Education